Maiwakhola is a rural municipality located in the Taplejung District in the Province No. 1 of eastern Nepal. The total area of the municipality is 138 km2. The local body was formed on 10 March 2021 by merging three VDCs of Phakumba, Sanghu and Dhungesanghu. Currently, it has a total of 6 wards. The population of the rural municipality is 10,365 (5264 females and 5,101 males) according to the preliminary report of 2021 Nepal census.

References

Rural municipalities in Koshi Province
Rural municipalities in Taplejung District
Rural municipalities of Nepal established in 2017